Dolac is a village in the municipality of Travnik, Bosnia and Herzegovina.

Demographics
According to the 2013 census, its population was 480.

Notable people
Ivo Andrić, writer and the 1961 winner of the Nobel Prize for literature
Zlata Bartl, scientist and creator of Vegeta

References

Populated places in Travnik